Yeoman Island is an uninhabited member of the Arctic Archipelago in the territory of Nunavut. Located in Admiralty Inlet, it is an irregularly shaped Baffin Island offshore island. The Saneruarsuk Islands lie to its southeast.

External links 
 Yeoman Island in the Atlas of Canada - Toporama; Natural Resources Canada

Islands of Baffin Island
Uninhabited islands of Qikiqtaaluk Region